The 2002 All-Ireland Senior Camogie Championship Final was the 71st All-Ireland Final and the deciding match of the 2002 All-Ireland Senior Camogie Championship, an inter-county camogie tournament for the top teams in Ireland.

"Pocket-Rocket" Fiona O'Driscoll scored 3-2 to prevent a Tipp four-in-a-row.

References

All-Ireland Senior Camogie Championship Final
All-Ireland Senior Camogie Championship Final
All-Ireland Senior Camogie Championship Final, 2002
All-Ireland Senior Camogie Championship Finals
Cork county camogie team matches
Tipperary county camogie team matches